Blood and Ties (lit. Accomplices) is a 2013 South Korean crime-thriller film written and directed by Guk Dong-seok, and starring Son Ye-jin and Kim Kap-soo. It follows a budding journalist who suspects that her doting father may have been the culprit in a kidnap-murder case 15 years ago.

Plot
Da-eun (Son Ye-jin) has completed graduate school and is set to become a newspaper reporter. She lives with her father Son-man (Kim Kap-soo) who lovingly refers to her as "my heart." Although her father does menial work, Da-eun is proud of him.

One day, Da-eun goes to the movies with her boyfriend Jae-kyung (Lee Kyu-han) and friend Bo-ra (Jo An). They watch a movie based on a real-life unsolved crime: A boy was kidnapped and the kidnapper demanded ransom from the parents, but the child was later found dead. The only clue the police had to the killer's identity was the ransom phone call he made to the parents. At the end of the film, they play the actual recorded audio from that phone call. Da-eun freezes when she hears the voice; the man's voice sounds eerily like her father and he also uses the phrase "It Ain't Over 'til It's Over," which her father always favored.

When Da-eun gets back home, she looks up the crime that took place nearly 15 years ago on the internet. Awash with horror and guilt for even suspecting her father, she begins to look into his past with only a few days remaining before the statute of limitations lapses on the unsolved crime. As the relationship between father and daughter wrenches apart due to mounting distrust, a man (Im Hyung-joon) from Son-man's past suddenly appears.

Cast

Son Ye-jin as Jung Da-eun
Park Sa-rang as young Da-eun
Kim Kap-soo as Jung Son-man 
Im Hyung-joon as Shin Joon-young
Lee Kyu-han as Kim Jae-kyung
Jo An as Yeon Bo-ra 
Kim Kwang-kyu as Detective Jang
Kang Shin-il as Han Sang-soo 
Park Joo-yong as Choi Yong-joo
Han Kyung-min as Son Kwang-min
Seo Kap-sook as Shim Mi-ok 
Im Jong-yoon as Professor Kim 
Choi Eun-seok as Detective Kim 
Kim Ho-seung as Detective Min 
Jeon Joon-hyeok as Han Chae-jin 
Song Jeong-woo as Mi-seon's father 
Kim Tae-ri as Mi-seon's mother

Release
Blood and Ties was released in theaters on October 24, 2013. It topped the box office during its opening weekend, selling 648,000 tickets.

The film also received a limited North American release, opening in six cities in the U.S. and Canada. It screened at the CGV Cinema in Los Angeles on November 1, 2013, followed by Vancouver's Cineplex Silvercity, New York City's AMC Bay Terrace, Atlanta's AMC Colonial, Honolulu's Consolidated Pearlri and Toronto's Yonge-Dundas on November 8.

Awards and nominations

References

External links
 

2013 films
2013 crime thriller films
South Korean crime thriller films
CJ Entertainment films
2010s South Korean films